Astro Malaysia Holdings is a Malaysian media and entertainment holding company that began as a paid digital satellite radio and television service, Astro. The company is owned by Astro Holdings Sendirian Berhad, which also owns Astro Overseas Limited. It serves 5.7 million homes or 72% of Malaysian TV households, 7,500 enterprises, 17.2 million weekly radio listeners (FM and digital), 14.7 million digital monthly unique visitors and 3.1 million shoppers across its TV, radio, digital and commerce platforms.

History 
In 1996, All Asia Broadcast Centre was headquartered at Bukit Jalil and launched its own satellite subscription service. At the same time, the MEASAT satellite network began with the launch of MEASAT 1. The new pay-television service named Astro launched and started broadcasting with 22 television channels and 8 music channels. The launch of more MEASAT satellites from 1998 onward allowed Astro to begin expanding its services.

The company achieved the Multimedia Super Corridor status in year 1997. In 2003, it acquired Celestial Pictures. After two years, Astro bought an Indian radio station in Malaysia by the name of Time Highway Radio. It also launched its first IPTV subscription service based on content licensed from Goal TV. It also bought Yes Television (Hong Kong) Limited and Goal TV Asia Limited to distribute broadband and television content in the region.

In 2006, Rohana Rozhan, CFO of AAAN, was elected as CEO of Astro Malaysia. On that same year, Astro launched Astro MAX, its first PVR service. In 2007, it launched its first VOD service, adding Hong Kong TVB dramas to the platform.

On 28 April 2008, Astro cảm xúc was launched in Vietnam as a joint venture with HTVC. It was also picked up by Vietnam Cable Television to be carried nationally. On 14 June 2010, AAAN was delisted from the Main Market of Bursa Malaysia Securities following a successful takeover offer by Usaha Tegas Sdn Bhd. Thus, its company name was changed to Astro Holdings Sdn Bhd. In 2012, the company was listed again on Malaysia's stock market.

Subsidiaries 
Astro Malaysia (Measat Broadcast Network Systems Sdn Bhd)
NJOI
Sooka
Astro Radio
Astro Shaw
Fetch TV

References

External links 
Astro Malaysia Holdings Investor Relations Website
 Astro Malaysia Website

Malaysian brands
Mass media companies established in 1996
Malaysian companies established in 1996
1996 establishments in Malaysia
Companies listed on Bursa Malaysia
Direct broadcast satellite services
Mass media companies of Malaysia
Holding companies of Malaysia
 
Companies based in Kuala Lumpur